Nanna Øland Fabricius (born 2 May 1985), better known by her stage name Oh Land, is a Danish-American musician, singer, songwriter, and dancer.

Early life
Oh Land was born in Copenhagen, the daughter of Bendt Fabricius, an organist (not to be confused with the composer Bent Fabricius Bjerre), and Bodil Øland, an opera singer. She is the great-great-grandchild of Lutheran missionary and ethnographer Otto Fabricius, who published Fauna Groenlandica in 1780, the first zoological observations of Greenland. She is a former student of the Royal Danish and Royal Swedish Ballet schools. However, an injury caused by a slipped disc and spinal fracture put an end to her dancing career, which eventually led her to start making music. She moved to New York City in January 2010 where she lived in the Williamsburg neighbourhood of Brooklyn.

Career

2008–2011: Debut, Fauna and Oh Land

Oh Land's debut album, Fauna, was released in her native Denmark on 10 November 2008 by Danish independent label Fake Diamond Records. For her eponymous follow-up album, she worked with producers Dan Carey, Dave McCracken and Lester Mendez. The album was released on 14 March 2011 and peaked at number five on the Danish Albums Chart. It also served as her debut in the United States, where it was released on 15 March 2011 by Epic Records, reaching number 184 on the Billboard 200 chart. An EP with the same name was previously released on 19 October 2010, containing four tracks from the full-length album. On 7 April 2011, she was given the Brink of Fame: Music Artist award at the 2011 NewNowNext Awards.

Oh Land made her US television debut performance on Late Show with David Letterman on 2 March 2011 performing her single "Sun of a Gun". She also performed it on Jimmy Kimmel Live! on 24 March 2011 and on The Late Late Show with Craig Ferguson on 25 May. Oh Land toured North America as the supporting act for Orchestral Manoeuvres in the Dark in March 2011, and supported Sia on North American dates of her We Are Born Tour in July and August 2011. She also opened for Katy Perry on select US dates of her California Dreams Tour in August 2011, and joined Perry again in October and November on the tour's second leg in the UK and Ireland. As an actress, Oh Land had a supporting role as Sara in the 2007 Danish psychological drama film . Her song "Speak Out Now" was used as the theme for the TV series Rita starting in 2012.

2012–2013: Wish Bone
On 20 May 2013, "Renaissance Girls" was released as the lead single from Oh Land's third studio album, Wish Bone. The album was released in Denmark on 16 September 2013, and will be released in the United States on 24 September via Dave Sitek's boutique label Federal Prism. The second single "Pyromaniac" was released on 2 September 2013. On 20 September, Oh Land kicked off her Wish Bone tour at the Music Hall of Williamsburg.  The show featured special guests Sun Rai and (Who Is) Anastasia, who will both also appear with her at Gramercy Theatre on 24 September.

2014: Acting, Voice Junior and Earth Sick
Oh Land also stars in the 2014 Danish western, The Salvation, as Marie, alongside Mads Mikkelsen, Eva Green and Eric Cantona, which premiered at the 2014 Cannes Film Festival on 17 May 2014.

On 28 June 2014, Oh Land revealed plans for her fourth record, which would be recorded in her Brooklyn apartment and crowdfunded in collaboration with PledgeMusic; part of the proceeds would also be donated to Greenpeace's Save the Arctic campaign. The album was ultimately titled Earth Sick, and its lead single "Head Up High" was released on 6 October 2014. Oh Land debuted "Head Up High" live on 23 September 2014 on Denmark's Voice Junior, for which she serves as a coach. The music video for "Head Up High" was released on 20 October 2014, with a world premiere on the Nylon website, which described it as "a victorious electro-jam smattered with twinkling bells and grounding percussion" and while that could be used to describe other songs, they felt the new track still demonstrated Oh Land's evolution and maturation as an artist. Nylon also announced that Earth Sick would be released on 11 November 2014 on Oh Land's Tusk or Tooth label. On 27 October, the title track from the album was made available to download for people who had pre-ordered the album on her pledge site, and the following day it was released as the instant download track on other retailers.

2015–present: Soundtracks and Family Tree
On 23 November 2015, Oh Land was announced as composer for the pantomime of Cinderella on Tivoli Pantomime Theatre, royal ballet with Queen Margrethe II as scenographer and the award-winning Russian choreographer Yuri Possokhovs. On 4 November 2016, Oh Land's first soundtrack album, was released digitally.

On 30 March 2018 she released the soundtrack album from the exhibition, "Watermusic". In 2018 Oh Land recorded "", a modified version of Denmark's national anthem, to serve as the theme of the Netflix series The Rain. 
On 27 May 2018 Oh Land performed at 50º Danish Crown Prince's birthday celebration on live TV. She played with the DR symphony orchestra, livgarden, the DR junior choir and 25 dancers as well as musicians Adi Zukanovic and Hans Hvidberg at the Danish Royal Arena in Copenhagen. On July 2018 she became an ambassador from WWF's Wild Schoolprojekt and travelled to Kenya to an action from the project.

On 11 February 2019 she released the single "Human Error" and announced her new album Family Tree to be released 3 May 2019. That year, she also made her debut as a judge on the twelfth season of Danish TV show X Factor.

Oh Land wrote the music to a musical installment of the Hans Christian Andersen fairy tale "The Snow Queen", premiering on 1 December 2019 in Tivoli Concert Hall. Consumes were designed by Queen Margrethe II.

Oh Land collaborated with British trip hop artist Tricky on his 2020 album Fall to Pieces.

2022: Xtra EP and "international album"
Between 15 May - 4 Jun 2022 Oh Land played Anna I in the opera "Manualen & De syv dødssynder", perfomed in Danish and German.

On October 11, 2022, Oh Land announced (via Instagram) she was working on an all-Danish EP to be released later that year and an international album coming out in spring of 2023. "Bad Timing" was announced as a Danish single on October 19, subsequently releasing the entire EP, Xtra, on November 11, including three more tracks.

Personal life
In 2016, Oh Land moved back to Denmark. She married artist and designer Eske Kath in 2013 at a zoo in Denmark. On 14 February 2016 she gave birth to her first son Svend in New York. The family moved to Søborg, a northern suburb of Copenhagen, after Svend was born. A separation permit for the couple was issued on the 23rd of October 2018 by the Danish government. She has a small dog named Ujan that travels with her sometimes. On 21 August 2020 Oh Land gave birth to her second son by her boyfriend, Adi Zukanović, known to the public as Moust; the child's real name remains a family secret.

Musical style 
In 2011, The Line of Best Fit described Oh Land's music as pop that is both catchy and experimental. The magazine said her vocals have a wide range and go from gentle to soaring. In 2020, Higher Plain Music felt her album Family Tree represented a new direction; more album while retaining quirky element. They said there was a gospel influence, vocal and use of orchestral synths.

Discography 

 Fauna (2008)
 Oh Land (2011)
 Wish Bone (2013)
 Earth Sick (2014)
 Family Tree (2019)

Filmography

References

External links

 
 
 

1985 births
21st-century Danish  women singers
Danish ballerinas
Danish dance musicians
Danish electronic musicians
Danish expatriates in the United States
Danish pop singers
Danish women singer-songwriters
English-language singers from Denmark
Epic Records artists
Feminist musicians
Living people
Musicians from Copenhagen
People from Williamsburg, Brooklyn
Royal Danish Ballet dancers
Royal Swedish Ballet dancers
Singers from New York City
Synth-pop singers
Women in electronic music
21st-century American women singers
21st-century American singers